Birds Without Wings is a novel by Louis de Bernières, written in 2004. Narrated by various characters, it tells the tragic love story of Philothei and Ibrahim. It also chronicles the rise of Mustafa Kemal Atatürk, the 'Father of the Turkish Nation'. The overarching theme of the story covers the impact of religious intolerance, overzealous nationalism, and the war that often results. The characters are unwittingly caught up in historical tides outside of their control.

The book's title is taken from a saying by one of the characters, Iskander the Potter, "Man is a bird without wings, and a bird is a man without sorrows."
The book includes a vivid and detailed description of the horrors of life in the trenches during World War I. Some of the characters are also present in the author's earlier novel Captain Corelli's Mandolin.

Plot summary

The pace of the book is languid, even slow. The story is set in Eskibahçe, a small fictional village in southwestern coastal Anatolia during the 1900s, spanning World War I and the era of Turkish nationalism. The Battle of Gallipoli takes place halfway through the novel.

The book is written from several different points of view. Chapter by chapter the first person account is from the perspective of Dorsoula, or Ibrahim, or Ayse, or one of many other characters including a wealthy merchant based in Smyrna (now Izmir). All points of view are credible, even insightful at times.

Characters
Philothei — Most beautiful girl of Eskibahçe
Ibrahim the Goatherd — Philothei's long standing admirer and betrothed, who becomes crazy upon his return from the war
Abdulhamid Hodja — The local imam.
Ayse — Abdulhamid Hodja's wife.
Charitos — Father of Philothei and Mehmetçik.
Drosoula — Philothei's best friend. Married to Gerasimos the fisherman.
Iskander the Potter — Father of Karatavuk and maker of proverbs.
Karatavuk (Turkish for 'Blackbird') — His real name is Abdul. He is also the youngest son of Iskander the Potter. He fights for the Ottoman Empire in World War I and against the Greeks during the subsequent invasion of Anatolia. After returning home, he loses his right arm when his father (unknowingly) shoots him. As a result, he cannot carry on his father's vocation as potter, and so becomes Karatavuk the Letter-Writer, acting as town scribe.
Leyla — Rustem Bey's Circassian mistress, who is in fact Greek.
Mehmetçik (Turkish for 'Red Robin') — Philothei's younger brother and Karatavuk's best friend. His real name is Nicos.
Mustafa Kemal — Mustafa Kemal Atatürk
Polyxeni — Mother of Philothei and Mehmetçik. Wife of Charitos. Good friends with Ayse.
Rustem Bey — the town's wealthy agha.

Further information 

The book was shortlisted for the 2004 Whitbread Novel Award and the 2005 Commonwealth Writers Prize (Eurasia Region, Best Book).

Although fiction, the setting of Eskibahçe is based upon Kayaköy (Greek: Levissi Λεβισσι) village near Fethiye (coordinates: 36.574N, 29.088E), the ruins of which still exist today. Once a thriving Greek village, this town of over one thousand houses, two churches, fourteen chapels, and two schools, was completely deserted in 1923 when the Greek inhabitants living there, along with a vast number of Greeks living throughout Turkey were deported to Greece through a massive government mandated population exchange between the two countries following the Turkish war of independence. Historically, Turks and Greeks had lived together in this region for centuries, the Turks as farmers in the Kaya valley and the Greeks living on the hillside dealing in crafts and trades. A Greek presence in this region goes back centuries. Since then, the village of Kayakoy, as it is called in Turkish, or Karmylassos, as it was called in Greek, which had been continually inhabited since at least the 13th century, has stood empty and crumbling, with only the breeze from the mountains and mist from the sea blowing through its empty houses and streets. Attempts by the Turkish government to get Turks deported from Greece to inhabit the village failed, and eventually, in the 1950s, the roofs of all the houses were removed.

2004 British novels
Novels by Louis de Bernières
Novels set in Turkey
Novels set during World War I
Secker & Warburg books